Dennis Montgomery may refer to:
 Dennis Montgomery III (born 1965), African-American pianist, organist, and professor
 Dennis L. Montgomery (born 1953), American software designer